John Kenneth Drinkall, CMG (1 January 1922 – 30 May 2015) was a British diplomat. Educated at Haileybury and Imperial Service College and Brasenose College, Oxford, he was Ambassador to Afghanistan from 1972 to 1976. From 1976 to 1981 he was High Commissioner to Jamaica and non-resident Ambassador to Haiti. He died on 30 May 2015 at the age of 93.

References

Ambassadors of the United Kingdom to Afghanistan
Ambassadors of the United Kingdom to Haiti
High Commissioners of the United Kingdom to Jamaica
1922 births
2015 deaths
Alumni of Brasenose College, Oxford
Companions of the Order of St Michael and St George
People educated at Haileybury and Imperial Service College